Emmerdale is a British soap opera first broadcast on 16 October 1972. The soap has earned various awards and nominations over the years for storylines and the performances from cast and crew members.

All About Soap Awards
The All About Soap Awards were launched in 2002 and were hosted by All About Soap magazine.

British Academy Television Awards
The British Academy Television Awards were launched in 1954 and are presented during an annual award show hosted by the British Academy of Film and Television Arts.

The British Soap Awards
The British Soap Awards is an annual awards ceremony to honour the best of British soap operas. The first ceremony took place in 1999.

Broadcast Awards
The Broadcast Awards are run by Broadcast magazine. They recognise and reward excellence in and around the UK television programming industry.

Digital Spy Soap Awards
The Digital Spy Soap Awards are hosted by the entertainment website Digital Spy. The first awards were presented in 2008. In 2011, the website held the Digital Spy Readers' Awards instead.

Inside Soap Awards
The Inside Soap Awards are an annual award ceremony that have been run by Inside Soap since 1996.

National Television Awards
The National Television Awards were launched in 1995 and they are broadcast by ITV. The awards are voted on by the general public.

Royal Television Society Awards

Royal Television Society Craft & Design Awards

Television and Radio Industries Club Awards

TV Now Awards
The TV Now Awards is an annual awards ceremony, which takes place in Ireland. The awards celebrate favourite television moments from the previous year.

TVTimes Awards
The TVTimes Awards began in 1969 and are awarded by TVTimes magazine.

TV Quick and TV Choice Awards

Other awards

References

External links
 Awards and nominations for Emmerdale at the Internet Movie Database

Awards and nominations
Lists of awards by television series
Awards and nominations received by Emmerdale